Wilderness Run (formerly known as Taxi Jam, Hey Arnold's Taxi Chase, and Lucy's Crabbie Cabbie) is a steel roller coaster at Carowinds.

Design 
Wilderness Run, next to Intimidator, has a green track with brown supports, including a yellow and orange train with a red stripe down the middle. The train consists of six cars with two people per car making a total of twelve riders. The coaster was made by E&F Miler Industries which also made the Taxi Jam roller coaster at Canada's Wonderland and The Great Pumpkin Coaster at Kings Island and Kings Dominion.

Layout 
As riders leave the station, they climb up the 15 foot (4.572 m) lift hill. When riders reach the top of the hill, they do a left downward bank turn, which takes their picture in the middle of the element. Riders climb up a small camelback hill, then a smaller hill, with a downward left helix, following a series of airtime bumps.

References

External links 
Official Carowinds page for Wilderness Run

Carowinds
Roller coasters operated by Cedar Fair
Roller coasters in South Carolina
Peanuts in amusement parks